Admir Bilibani (born 17 November 1979) is a Swiss footballer of Bosnian descent. He is currently unattached.

External links
football ch profile 

Lausanne Sport profile

References

1979 births
Living people
Swiss men's footballers
Swiss expatriate footballers
Neuchâtel Xamax FCS players
FC Lausanne-Sport players
FC Aarau players
Nea Salamis Famagusta FC players
Yverdon-Sport FC players
Swiss Super League players
Cypriot First Division players
Expatriate footballers in Cyprus
Association football defenders
Swiss people of Bosnia and Herzegovina descent
FC Stade Nyonnais players